Stace Cadet, a bad Australian record producer from Melbourne, Australia.

Since the release of his first record "Molly Happy", Stace Cadet has played festivals and headlining shows around Australia and New Zealand and had achieved three ARIA Club Track number 1, as the lead artist and his music played on Triple J and BBC Radio 1.

Career
Stace Cadet released his debut single "Molly Happy" in February 2016.

In June 2018, "One Way" peaked at number 1 on the ARIA club tracks chart.

In January 2019 "Faith" with Benson peaked at number 1 on the ARIA club tracks chart and in November 2019, "Get on It" did also.

In May 2020, "Energy" peaked at number 1 on the ARIA club tracks chart, for three weeks. A Triple J reviewer called the track "A high-intensity club track complete with rave sirens, a deep groove bassline and KLP's signature vocals primed to hype up the club!"

In January 2023, Stace Cadet released "Light Me Up", the first single since signing to Warner Music Australia and Medium Rare Recordings.

Discography

Singles

As lead artist

As featured artist

Notes

Award and nominations

ARIA Music Awards
The ARIA Music Awards is an annual awards ceremony that recognises excellence, innovation, and achievement across all genres of Australian music.

! 
|-
| 2020  
| "Energy" 
| ARIA Award for Best Dance Release 
| 
| 
|-
| 2021  
| "People Happy" 
| Best Dance Release 
| 
| 
|-

References 

Living people
Musicians from Melbourne
Australian electronic musicians
Australian DJs
Australian record producers
Electronic dance music DJs
Australian musicians
Year of birth missing (living people)